Gösta Lundquist (15 August 1892 – 10 October 1944) was a Swedish sailor. He was a crew member of the Swedish boat Kullan that won the gold medal in the 30 m2 class at the 1920 Summer Olympics.

References

1892 births
1944 deaths
Swedish male sailors (sport)
Sailors at the 1920 Summer Olympics – 30m2 Skerry cruiser
Olympic sailors of Sweden
Olympic gold medalists for Sweden
Olympic medalists in sailing
Kullaviks Kanot- och Kappseglingsklubb sailors
Medalists at the 1920 Summer Olympics
Sportspeople from Gothenburg
20th-century Swedish people